Aleksandr Romanovich Krendelev (born 29 January 1986) is a Russian former professional footballer.

Club career
He made his professional debut in the Russian Second Division in 2004 for FC Severstal Cherepovets. He made his Russian Football National League debut for FC KAMAZ Naberezhnye Chelny on 28 March 2009 in a game against FC Metallurg Lipetsk.

References

1986 births
Sportspeople from Ivanovo Oblast
Living people
Russian footballers
Association football midfielders
FC KAMAZ Naberezhnye Chelny players
FC Volgar Astrakhan players
FC Mordovia Saransk players
FC Tekstilshchik Ivanovo players
FC Neftekhimik Nizhnekamsk players
FC Orenburg players
FC Sheksna Cherepovets players
FC Mashuk-KMV Pyatigorsk players